Platypodanthera is a genus of plants in the tribe Eupatorieae within the family Asteraceae.

Species
The only known species is Platypodanthera melissifolia, native to eastern Brazil (States of Bahia and Pernambuco).

References

Eupatorieae
Monotypic Asteraceae genera
Endemic flora of Brazil